Antonio "Toni" Jiménez Sistachs (born 12 October 1970) is a Spanish former professional footballer who played as a goalkeeper, currently a goalkeeping coach.

He appeared in 236 La Liga matches over nine seasons, seven of those spent with Espanyol. He also represented in the competition Rayo Vallecano and Atlético Madrid.

Jiménez helped Spain win the gold medal at the 1992 Summer Olympics. He played three times with the full side later that decade.

Club career
Born in La Garriga, Barcelona, Catalonia, Jiménez had a stint with local giants FC Barcelona's third team to kickstart his senior career. He made his professional debut with neighbours UE Figueres on loan, being backup then first choice for two Segunda División seasons.

In 1992, Jiménez moved to Rayo Vallecano after terminating his previous contract with Real Zaragoza. Initially a backup to Wilfred Agbonavbare, he benefitted from an injury to the Nigerian in the second round to make his La Liga debut against CD Logroñés, although he finished the campaign on the bench again.

The following year, Jiménez accompanied coach José Antonio Camacho to RCD Espanyol, then in the second tier. He was an undisputed starter during his six-year spell, winning the Ricardo Zamora Trophy in his first season, qualifying for the UEFA Cup immediately afterwards and making nearly 300 competitive appearances.

Jiménez signed for Atlético Madrid in summer 1999, being highly unsuccessful there. Barred by José Francisco Molina in his first year, the team from the capital were also relegated. Furthermore, in the final of the Copa del Rey against former side Espanyol, he was stripped off the ball by former teammate Raúl Tamudo's head for the final 2–1.

Jiménez regained first-choice status at Elche CF, but returned to the top flight and Espanyol in January 2003 when new boss Javier Clemente requested his signing. At the end of the following campaign, he retired from the game at almost 34; he stayed connected with the latter in directorial capacities, leaving in March 2006 when director of football Cristóbal Parralo also resigned.

Jiménez served his first coaching spell also in Catalonia, as assistant in Girona FC. In May 2009 he returned to the club as goalkeeper coach and, two years later, signed with Espanyol as assistant to Mauricio Pochettino; the pair linked up again in January 2013, after the latter was appointed at Southampton.

In late May 2014, both Pochettino and Jiménez signed for another team in the Premier League, Tottenham Hotspur.

International career
Jiménez had not yet played top-division football when he was selected by coach Vicente Miera to the 1992 Summer Olympics, in local Barcelona. He beat competition from Santiago Cañizares, until then the starter, and played all the matches and minutes en route to the gold medal.

Additionally, Jiménez won three caps for the full side over one year, his first one being offered by Camacho, a friendly with Italy on 18 November 1998 (2–2, in Salerno). He seemed poised to be called as third choice for UEFA Euro 2000, but 19-year-old Iker Casillas was chosen instead.

Honours
Espanyol
Segunda División: 1993–94

Atlético Madrid
Copa del Rey runner-up: 1999–2000

Spain U23
Summer Olympic Games: 1992

Individual
Ricardo Zamora Trophy: 1993–94 (Segunda División), 1997–98

References

External links

1970 births
Living people
People from Vallès Oriental
Sportspeople from the Province of Barcelona
Spanish footballers
Footballers from Catalonia
Association football goalkeepers
La Liga players
Segunda División players
Segunda División B players
Tercera División players
FC Barcelona C players
FC Barcelona players
UE Figueres footballers
Rayo Vallecano players
RCD Espanyol footballers
Atlético Madrid footballers
Elche CF players
Spain under-21 international footballers
Spain under-23 international footballers
Spain international footballers
Footballers at the 1992 Summer Olympics
Olympic footballers of Spain
Medalists at the 1992 Summer Olympics
Olympic medalists in football
Olympic gold medalists for Spain
Southampton F.C. non-playing staff
Tottenham Hotspur F.C. non-playing staff
Paris Saint-Germain F.C. non-playing staff
Spanish expatriate sportspeople in England
Spanish expatriate sportspeople in France